There are 45 streams named Willow Creek in the U.S. state of Montana.

 Willow Creek (Beaverhead County, Montana), el. 
 Willow Creek (Beaverhead County, Montana), el. 
 Willow Creek (Big Horn County, Montana), el. 
 Willow Creek (Big Horn County, Montana), el. 
 Willow Creek (Big Horn County, Montana), el. 
 Willow Creek (Big Horn County, Montana), el. 
 Willow Creek (Big Horn County, Montana), el. 
 Willow Creek (Blaine County, Montana), el. 
 Willow Creek (Blaine County, Montana), el. 
 Willow Creek (Carbon County, Montana), el. 
 Willow Creek (Carter County, Montana), el. 
 Willow Creek (Cascade County, Montana), el. 
 Willow Creek (Chouteau County, Montana), el. 
 Willow Creek (Deer Lodge County, Montana), el. 
 Willow Creek (Fergus County, Montana), el. 
 Willow Creek (Flathead County, Montana), el. 
 Willow Creek (Gallatin County, Montana), el. 
 Willow Creek (Glacier County, Montana), el. 
 Willow Creek (Glacier County, Montana), el. 
 Willow Creek (Judith Basin County, Montana), el. 
 Willow Creek (Lewis and Clark County, Montana), el. 
 Willow Creek (Lewis and Clark County, Montana), el. 
 Willow Creek (Lewis and Clark County, Montana), el. 
 Willow Creek (Lewis and Clark County, Montana), el. 
 Willow Creek (Lewis and Clark County, Montana), el. 
 Willow Creek (Lewis and Clark County, Montana), el. 
 Willow Creek (Lewis and Clark County, Montana), el. 
 Willow Creek (Liberty County, Montana), el. 
 Willow Creek (Madison County, Montana), el. 
 Willow Creek (Madison County, Montana), el. 
 Willow Creek (Meagher County, Montana), el. 
 Willow Creek (Meagher County, Montana), el. 
 Willow Creek (Musselshell County, Montana), el. 
 Willow Creek (Park County, Montana), el. 
 Willow Creek (Powder River County, Montana), el. 
 Willow Creek (Powder River County, Montana), el. 
 Willow Creek (Powell County, Montana), el. 
 Willow Creek (Ravalli County, Montana), el. 
 Willow Creek (Sanders County, Montana), el. 
 Willow Creek (Sheridan County, Montana), el. 
 Willow Creek (Teton County, Montana), el. 
 Willow Creek (Treasure County, Montana), el. 
 Willow Creek (Valley County, Montana), el. 
 Willow Creek (Valley County, Montana), el. 
 Willow Creek (Wheatland County, Montana), el.

See also
 List of rivers of Montana
 Montana Stream Access Law

Notes

Rivers of Montana